Ruillé-le-Gravelais is a former commune in the Mayenne department in north-western France. On 1 January 2016, it was merged into the new commune of Loiron-Ruillé.

Geography
The river Oudon flows through the middle of the commune and forms part of its southern border.

See also
Communes of Mayenne

References

Ruillelegravelais